The Wisbuy Sea Law, also known as the Gotland Sea Law, was a compilation of medieval maritime laws created in the 1400s. These laws themselves originated from the thirteenth and fourteenth centuries. The Wisbuy Sea Law did not originate in Wisbuy but obtained its name, it has been assumed, because the exemplar of the first printed edition (which is the first to mention Wisbuy and Gotland) was kept in Wisbuy (the capital of the island Gotland).

Contents

The text includes common laws which were meant to apply for European countries involved with trade overseas. The rules included solutions to likely dilemmas such as jettison, shipwreck and ship collision. The laws were to some extent used in the later medieval period but were partly out of date by that time.

Usage

Predecessors of the Wisbuy Sea Law combined two laws: the Flemish/Dutch translation of the Rôles d’Oléron, known as Vonnesse Damme, from about 1286, and Ordinancie from the second half of the fourteenth century. This text was referred to as the ‘Waterrecht’ (water law) and was spread to different northern European towns. Subsequently, a number of articles  originating in Lübeck were added in some Danish manuscripts in the fifteenth century. The first printed edition of this text was made in Copenhagen by Godfried von Gemen in 1505. Gemen referred to the text in his edition as the highest sea law. A second edition emerged in 1532 (in Amsterdam) and a third one in 1537 (in Lübeck). This latter edition included seven Articles from the Lübeck Town Law of 1294, eight articles from Ordnung für Schiffer und Schiffsleute from Lübeck and one article from an unknown source.

References

External links 

14th century in international relations
Admiralty law
Visby
Gotland